The following outline is provided as an overview of and topical guide to radio:

Radio – transmission of signals by modulation of electromagnetic waves with frequencies below those of visible light. Electromagnetic radiation travels by means of oscillating electromagnetic fields that pass through the air and the vacuum of space. Information is carried by systematically changing (modulating) some property of the radiated waves, such as amplitude, frequency, phase, or pulse width. When radio waves pass an electrical conductor, the oscillating fields induce an alternating current in the conductor. This can be detected and transformed into sound or other signals that carry information.

Essence of radio 

Radio
 Broadcasting
 Wireless
 Radio broadcasting

Applications 

 Amateur radio
 Direction finding
 Radio broadcasting
 AM broadcasting
 FM broadcasting
 Shortwave broadcasting
 Radar
 Radio astronomy
 Radio navigation
 Radiotelephone
 Software-defined radio
 Two-way radio (Aviation, Land-based commercial, Government, Marine)
 Mission critical communication TETRA and P25
 Wireless power transfer

Types of radio broadcasting 

 Campus radio
 Commercial radio
 Community radio
 International broadcasting
 Internet radio
 Music radio
 Pirate radio
 Public radio

Radio broadcasting topics 
 Disc jockey
 Radio documentary
 Radio format
 Radio personality
 Radio programming

History of radio 

History of radio
 Invention of radio
 Wireless telegraphy
 Spark-gap transmitter
 Alexanderson alternator
 Antique radio
 Coherer
 Continuous wave
 Crystal radio
 Vacuum tube
 Amplitude modulation
 Old-time radio
 Radioteletype
 Table of years in radio (events by year)
 Timeline of radio

Radio science 

Radio science
 Antenna (radio)
 Carrier current
 Electromagnetic radiation
 Radio frequency (electricity and electromagnetic waves)
 Radio spectrum (electromagnetic waves)
 Radio propagation
 Receiver (radio)
 Transmitter
 Types of radio emissions

Radio technology 
 Antenna matching unit
 Batteryless radio
 Digital radio
 Preselector
 Radio frequency power amplifier
 Radio software
 Superheterodyne receiver
 Tuner (radio)

Radio stations 
 Radio stations in Africa
 Radio stations in Asia
 Radio stations in Australia
 Radio stations in Europe
 Radio stations in North America
 Radio stations in South America
 Radio stations in the South Pacific and Oceania

Persons influential in the field of radio 
 Michael Faraday (predictions)
 James Clerk Maxwell (theoretical work)
 Heinrich Rudolf Hertz (experimental demonstrations)
 Oliver Lodge (techniques for transmitting and receiving radio waves) 
 Guglielmo Marconi (adapted radio waves for use in signalling)
 Reginald Fessenden (developed  amplitude modulation (AM) radio and first voice transmission)
 Edwin Howard Armstrong (developed frequency modulation (FM) )

Alternatives
 Cable FM
 Free-space optical communication (FSO)
 Internet radio

Other
 Bandstacked
 
 Years in radio

See also 

 :Category:Radio by country

References

External links 

Radio
Radio
Outline